Kamnitzer is a surname. Notable people with the surname include:

Bernhard Kamnitzer (1890–1959), German jurist and politician
Heinz Kamnitzer (1917–2001), German writer and historian
Peter Kamnitzer (1921–1998), German-born American architect

Surnames of German origin